Amphidromus cambojiensis is a species of air-breathing land snail, a terrestrial pulmonate gastropod mollusc in the family Camaenidae.

Distribution 
The type locality of this species is Cambodia.

References 

cambojiensis
Gastropods described in 1860